Cheekkode  is a village in Malappuram district in the state of Kerala, India.

Demographics
 India census, Cheekkode had a population of 19375 with 9731 males and 9644 females.

Transportation
Cheekode village connects to other parts of India through Feroke town on the west and Nilambur town on the east.  National highway No.66 passes through Feroke and the northern stretch connects to Goa and Mumbai.  The southern stretch connects to Cochin and Trivandrum.  State Highway No.28 starts from Nilambur and connects to Ooty, Mysore and Bangalore through Highways.12,29 and 181. The nearest airport is at Kozhikode.  The nearest major railway station is at Calicut.

References

Villages in Malappuram district
Kondotty area